Gustave Alphonse Fahy (1 March 1880 – 18 August 1967) was a French gymnast. He competed in the men's individual all-around event at the 1900 Summer Olympics.

References

External links
 

1880 births
1967 deaths
French male artistic gymnasts
Olympic gymnasts of France
Gymnasts at the 1900 Summer Olympics
People from Nanterre
Sportspeople from Hauts-de-Seine